Gerald David "Lorenzo" Music (May 2, 1937 – August 4, 2001) was an American actor, producer and writer. Music was as a writer and a regular performer on the controversial CBS variety show The Smothers Brothers Comedy Hour. In the 1970s, Music co-created the sitcom The Bob Newhart Show with David Davis and composed its theme music with his wife, Henrietta. He also wrote episodes for The Mary Tyler Moore Show and Rhoda, and got his major voiceover role for playing the unseen, but often heard, Carlton the Doorman in Rhoda. Music gained fame in the 1980s for voicing Jim Davis' comic strip character Garfield on twelve animated specials, and later in cartoons, video games, and commercials until his death in 2001. Music's distinctive voice of Garfield is still often used in animated specials in his legacy.

Early life
Gerald David Music was born on May 2, 1937, in Brooklyn, New York. He was six years old when his family moved to Duluth, Minnesota, for his father's job at one of the shipyards.

He was a student at Central High School and then at the University of Minnesota Duluth. Music met his wife Henrietta at the latter, in the Theatre Arts Department. Together, they formed a comedy duo named Gerald and His Hen, who performed together for eight years.

Music changed his first name to Lorenzo for spiritual reasons after he became a member of the international spiritual association Subud.

Career

Writing career (1962–1981)
Music became a writer and a regular performer on The Smothers Brothers Comedy Hour during 1968 and 1969. His work as a writer on The Mary Tyler Moore Show in 1970 would lead him to his big break. Music was the co-creator of The Bob Newhart Show with his producer/writing partner David Davis. The show ran on CBS from 1972 to 1978; he also co-wrote the theme song to the show with his wife Henrietta.

Music continued writing for The Mary Tyler Moore Show spin-off Rhoda. While casting Rhoda, the producers were looking for a voice actor to play the part of a character that would be heard but never seen, Carlton the doorman. When they heard Music's sleepy, husky voice, they offered him that role, which made his voice recognizable to a worldwide television audience. The character was popular enough to warrant a one-off single in 1975 called "Who Is It?" (b/w "The Girl in 510", United Artists UA-XW643-X), which became a regional hit. Music also co-produced and co-wrote a 1980 animated special called Carlton Your Doorman which won an Emmy Award. Though it was a pilot episode, CBS did not pick it up as a series.

In 1976, Lorenzo and Henrietta were given the opportunity to host a syndicated television variety show of their own. The Lorenzo and Henrietta Music Show was produced at a time when there was a glut of television variety shows, but it did not last. In 1983, Music voiced the character Ralph the All-Purpose Animal in the stop-motion animated film Twice Upon a Time.

Garfield (1982–2001)

In 1982, Jim Davis's Garfield was the most popular comic strip in America. Compilation books and merchandising of the strip were topping best seller lists, and Davis was negotiating to make an animated television special. Producers needed someone to voice the main character in the strip: Garfield, a fat, lazy, sarcastic, and demanding cat. The audition attracted several famed vocal talents, including Sterling Holloway, the voice of Winnie the Pooh. After one audition, Music was immediately cast as the voice of Garfield; in Davis's words, "I looked at the room full of [voice] actors, and then in the corner I saw Lorenzo, quietly licking himself". Music would serve as the voice of Garfield in more than 12 television specials, in the Garfield and Friends animated television series that ran from 1988-1994 on CBS, video games and commercials until 2001. He last voiced Garfield for an automobile commercial that year.

Other voice work
Music voiced characters for shows such as TaleSpin as Sgt. Dunder, The Real Ghostbusters as the original voice of Peter Venkman, Adventures of the Gummi Bears as Tummi Gummi, Fluppy Dogs as Ozzie the Green Cool Fluppy, Pac-Man, Pound Puppies as Teensy in the season 2 episode Little Big Dog, and Darkwing Duck. In the mid-1990s, after Garfield and Friends, Darkwing Duck and Disney's Adventures of the Gummi Bears concluded, Music retired from cartoon voice acting.

During the 1980s, Music also did voice-overs for many commercials for prime-time TV, such as Larry the Crash Test Dummy in the "You Could Learn a Lot from a Dummy" public safety announcements sponsored by the U.S. Department of Transportation and for Florida grapefruit juice, a lesser-known series of commercials extolling Florida agriculture as opposed to the more popular "Florida orange juice" commercials.

In keeping with his beliefs in Subud and emphasis on charity, Music frequently volunteered his time on a suicide hotline. Music recalled that sometimes a caller would change his tone: "I am bankrupt, my wife ran off with another man... Hey, you sound just like that cat on TV!"

Later years (1995–2001)
In 1996, Music's voice could be heard on Stan Freberg's Stan Freberg Presents the United States of America Volume Two album, released as a CD by Rhino Records. Music appeared on the album as James Madison and Robert E. Lee. Music also appeared as an intercom announcer on an episode of The Drew Carey Show.

In the early 1990s, he served as the voice-over for commercials for Ore-Ida Potatoes and Fruit and Cream Strawberry Twinkies. He later served as the pitchman for Ruggles Ice Cream (a local brand from Orrville, Ohio).

Personal life
Music was married to composer/writer Henrietta Music; together they had four children.

Death
Music died from complications related to lung and bone cancer on August 4, 2001, aged 64. He was cremated and his ashes were scattered at sea.

Legacy
Since Music's death, Frank Welker has often replaced him as the voice of Garfield in recent productions of the Garfield franchise including three fully-CGI films: Garfield Gets Real, Garfield's Fun Fest, and Garfield's Pet Force and the CGI animated series, The Garfield Show. In the live-action films Garfield: The Movie and Garfield: A Tail of Two Kitties, Garfield's voice was provided by Bill Murray. Coincidentally, Music voiced Peter Venkman (a role originally played by Murray) in the first two seasons of the animated series of The Real Ghostbusters, before being replaced by Dave Coulier. Welker provided the voices of Ray Stantz and Slimer in the same series.

Filmography

Film

Television

Video games

Production credits

Writer

Producer

Consultant

References

External links

1937 births
2001 deaths
American comedy writers
American male film actors
American male pop singers
American male television actors
American male voice actors
American people of Croatian descent
American Subud members
American television writers
Deaths from bone cancer
Deaths from lung cancer in California
Male actors from Duluth, Minnesota
Male actors from New York City
American male television writers
Musicians from Brooklyn
Musicians from Duluth, Minnesota
Primetime Emmy Award winners
Screenwriters from Minnesota
Screenwriters from New York (state)
Television producers from New York City
University of Minnesota Duluth alumni
20th-century American screenwriters
20th-century American male writers
20th-century American male singers
20th-century American singers
Television producers from Minnesota